Qaleh Sar (also Romanized as Qal‘eh Sar and Qal’eh Sar) is a village in Poshtkuh Rural District, Chahardangeh District, Sari County, Mazandaran Province, Iran. At the 2006 census, its population was 413, in 105 families.

References 

Populated places in Sari County